Françoise Prévost (13 January 1930 – 30 November 1997) was a French actress, journalist and author. She was the daughter of writer Marcelle Auclair. She appeared in more than 70 films between 1949 and 1985.

Life and career
Prévost was born and died in Paris, France. She made her film debut at 18, in Jean de la Lune. After several minor roles she emerged with the Nouvelle Vague, with roles of weight in films by Pierre Kast, Jean-Gabriel Albicocco and Jacques Rivette. Starting from 1960s she was also pretty active in the Italian cinema, starring in leading roles in dramas, comedies and genre films. In 1975 Prévost gained critical appreciation and commercial success as an author, with an autobiographical book about her struggle against an incurable disease, Ma vie en plus.

Selected filmography

 Jean de la Lune (1949) - (uncredited)
 Les miracles n'ont lieu qu'une fois (1951) - (uncredited)
 Clara de Montargis (1951)
 Leathernose (1952) - Une jeune invitée
 The Three Musketeers (1953) - Ketty
 Virgile (1953) - Mimi la Rouquine (uncredited)
 That Night (1958) - La secrétaire
 Le bel âge (1960) - Françoise
 The Enemy General (1960) - Nicole
 Women Are Like That (1960) - Isabelle
 Payroll (1961) - Katie Pearson
 Time Out for Love (1961) - Gladys
 Love Play (1961) - Anne de Limeuil
 La Morte-Saison des amours (1961) - Françoise
 La fille aux yeux d'or (1961) - Eléonore San Real
 Par-dessus le mur (1961) - Une mère
 The Game of Truth (1961) - Guylaine de Fleury
 Paris Belongs to Us (1961) - Terry Yordan
 Roaring Years (1962) - Figlia del medico (uncredited)
 Le Signe du lion (1962) - Hélène (uncredited)
 Bon Voyage! (1962) - The Girl
 The Condemned of Altona (1962) - Leni von Gerlach
 Il mare (1962)
  (1963) - Lilli
 The Verona Trial (1963) - Frau Beetz
 A Sentimental Attempt (1963) - Carla
 Portuguese Vacation (1963) - Françoise
 Thank You, Natercia (1963) - Françoise
 A Man in His Prime (1964) - Lucy
 The Glass Cage (1965)
 Galia (1966) - Nicole
 The Murder Clinic (1966) - Gisèle de Brantome
 Via Macau (1966) - Colette
 Maigret and His Greatest Case (1966) - Simone Lefèbvre
 L'une et l'autre (1967) - Simone
 Pronto... c'è una certa Giuliana per te (1967) - Paolo's Mother
 Italian Secret Service (1968) - Elvira Spallanzani
 Johnny Hamlet (1968) - Gertry Hamilton
 Spirits of the Dead (1968) - Friend of Countess (segment "Metzengerstein")
 A Woman on Fire (1969) - Clara Frisotti
  (1969) - Francine
 Quarta parete (1969) - Cristiana
 Les vieilles lunes (1969)
 Sirokkó (1969)
 I ragazzi del massacro (1969)
 La donna a una dimensione (1969) - Paola
 Un caso di coscienza (1970) - Sandra Solfi
 A Suitcase for a Corpse (1970) - Diana Ardington
 Mont-Dragon (1970) - La comtesse Germaine de Boismenil
 La prima notte del dottor Danieli, industriale, col complesso del... giocattolo (1970) - Virginia
 The Hideout (1971) - Charlotte
 La saignée (1971) - Mother
 Le inibizioni del dottor Gaudenzi, vedovo, col complesso della buonanima (1971) - Laura Gaudenzi
 Le belve (1971) - Clara Borsetti (segment "La voce del sangue")
 Quando l'amore è sensualità (1973) - Giulia Sanfelice
 Les anges (1973) - Anne
 The Sinful Nuns of Saint Valentine (1974) - The Abbess
 La prova d'amore (1974) - Angela Mother
 Mais où sont passées les jeunes filles en fleurs (1975) - Mme de Saintange
 Un urlo dalle tenebre (1975) - Barbara, Piero's mother
 Le téléphone rose (1975) - Françoise Castejac
 L'amour en herbe (1977) - La mère de Martine
 Mala, amore e morte (1977) - Adalgisa Belli
 Le soleil en face (1980) - Jeanne
 Merry-Go-Round (1981) - Renée Novick
 La côte d'amour (1982) - Jacqueline

References

External links

1930 births
1997 deaths
French film actresses
Deaths from cancer in France
Actresses from Paris
Writers from Paris
20th-century French actresses
20th-century French non-fiction writers
20th-century French women writers